This is a list of notable blogs. A blog (contraction of weblog) is a web site with frequent, periodic posts creating an ongoing narrative. They are maintained by both groups and individuals, the latter being the most common. Blogs can focus on a wide variety of topics, ranging from the political to personal experiences. Specific blogs include:  

Lists of websites